is a business district of Minato, Tokyo.

History 

Literally meaning "Tiger's Gate," Toranomon was the name of the southernmost gate of Edo Castle. The gate existed until the 1870s when it was demolished to make way for modern developments. The Toranomon Incident (虎ノ門事件 Toranomon Jiken) was an assassination attempt on the Prince Regent Hirohito of Japan on 27 December 1923 by communist agitator Daisuke Namba.

The district is home to many corporate headquarters. Air China has its Tokyo offices in the Air China Building in Toranomon. TV Tokyo, Japan Tobacco, Oki Electric Industry, Fuji Fire and Marine Insurance, and Mitsui O.S.K. Lines have their headquarters in Toranomon.

The National Printing Bureau has its headquarters in the district. Okura Museum of Art and Hotel Okura Tokyo are also located in Toranomon.

Education
Minato City Board of Education operates public elementary and junior high schools.

Toranmon 1-5-chōme is zoned to Onarimon Elementary School (御成門小学校) and Onarimon Junior High School (御成門中学校).

See also
Nihonbashi, Tokyo

References

External links 

Districts of Minato, Tokyo